Solaithevanpatti is a village in Theni, Tamil Nadu, India.

Villages in Theni district